Michele Russo (born 31 August 1986), is an Italian footballer who plays as a defender. He had previously played for Lavagnese, Cervia and Carrarese Calcio.

Club career
On 31 January 2019, he signed a 1.5-year contract with Ternana. On 28 December 2021, his contract with Ternana was terminated by mutual consent.

References

External links
 

1986 births
Footballers from Genoa
Living people
Italian footballers
Association football midfielders
Association football defenders
Carrarese Calcio players
Virtus Entella players
U.S. Cremonese players
Calcio Padova players
A.C.N. Siena 1904 players
Ternana Calcio players
Serie B players
Serie C players
Serie D players